The Buffalo Electric Vehicle Company was an American electric car manufacturing company from 1912 until 1915 located at 1219-1247 Main Street in Buffalo, New York.  The motorcars were marked under the Buffalo brand. The company was formed by a merger of several electrical vehicle and allied companies which included:

Babcock Electric Carriage Company (whose founder Francis A. Babcock became Buffalo's president)
Van Wagoner whose trucks were continued by the new company
The Buffalo Automobile Station Company 
Buffalo Electric Carriage Company
The Clark Motor Company

History
The company's automobiles were commonly marketed to affluent women as an alternative to the dangerous manual crank starting that was required with a gasoline vehicle. The company went out of business in 1916.

The Buffalo Electric Vehicle Company Building is a historic automobile factory and showroom located at Buffalo in Erie County, New York.  It was constructed in 1910–1911. The building has been redeveloped as home to "Artspace Buffalo."

The company's factory and showroom was listed on the National Register of Historic Places in 2005.

References

External links
Early Electric Car Companies
Buffalo Electric Vehicle Company Building - U.S. National Register of Historic Places on Waymarking.com
Preservation Studios Buffalo, NY: historic building rehabilitation and preservation consultants

Electric vehicles introduced in the 20th century
Vintage vehicles
Motor vehicle manufacturers based in New York (state)
Defunct motor vehicle manufacturers of the United States
Vehicle manufacturing companies established in 1912
1912 establishments in New York (state)
Vehicle manufacturing companies disestablished in 1915
Defunct companies based in New York (state)
1915 disestablishments in New York (state)